Fiora may refer to:
Fiora River, a river in northern Lazio and southern Tuscany, Italy
Fiora (musician) (Fiora Cutler, also known as Amy Cutler, born 1979), a singer, songwriter, producer and orchestral composer born in Australia and based in Berlin